Morville is a commune in the Manche department in Normandy in north-western France.

See also
 Communes of the Manche department

References

External links
 

Communes of Manche